Giuseppe "Pipolo" Moccia (22 June 1933 – 20 August 2006) was an Italian screenwriter and film director. He wrote for 96 films between 1958 and 2001. He also directed 21 films between 1964 and 1997. Most of the films he co-wrote and co-directed as a part of the Castellano & Pipolo duo. Their 1984 film Il ragazzo di campagna was shown as part of a retrospective on Italian comedy at the 67th Venice International Film Festival.

He was born in Viterbo, Italy and died in Rome, Italy. His son, Federico, is a well-known writer and also a screenwriter and director.

Selected filmography

 My Wife's Enemy (1959)
 Tipi da spiaggia (1959)
 Guardatele ma non toccatele (1959)
 Gentlemen Are Born (1960)
 Totò, Fabrizi e i giovani d'oggi (1960)
 The Two Rivals (1960)
 The Fascist (1961)
 Toto's First Night (1962)
 5 marines per 100 ragazze (1962)
 Obiettivo ragazze (1963)
 The Thursday (1963)
 Slalom (1965)
 The Man, the Woman and the Money (1965)
 Tell Me You Do Everything for Me (1976)
 I nuovi mostri (1977)
 Il ragazzo di campagna (1984)

References

External links

1933 births
2006 deaths
20th-century Italian screenwriters
Italian male screenwriters
Italian film directors
20th-century Italian male writers